Streatham Hill Theatre is a historic theatre in Lambeth, England. It was built in 1928–29 and was the last theatre designed by W. G. R. Sprague.

Opening in 1929, it staged theatre, opera, ballet and variety until 1962, apart from a period between 1944 and 1950 when it was closed due to bomb damage. In 1962 it closed to theatre, reopening as a Mecca bingo hall. Bingo continued under several operators until 2017.

It was Grade II listed in 1994 as "an unusually lavish example of a theatre built in the short-lived revival of building in 1929–30; as a suburban example of this date the building may be unique."

The building was added to the Theatre's Trust Theatres at Risk register in 2018.

Also in 2018, London Borough of Lambeth granted Asset of Community Value status to the theatre.

Since 2018, the building remains out of use, apart from a small slot machine lounge, and there is a campaign to save the theatre for the community, led by the Friends of Streatham Hill Theatre.

In 2021, Historic England added the theatre to its Heritage at Risk register.

In June 2022, SAVE Britain's Heritage added the theatre to its Buildings at Risk register.

References

External links

Theatres in the London Borough of Lambeth
1929 establishments in England